Fatema Zohora Rani is a Bangladesh Awami League politician and the former Member of Bangladesh Parliament from a reserved seat.

Early life
Rani was born on 11 July 1957 and she has studied up to S.S.C. degree.

Career
Rani was elected to parliament from a reserved seat as a Bangladesh Awami League candidate in 2014.

References

Awami League politicians
Living people
1957 births
Women members of the Jatiya Sangsad
10th Jatiya Sangsad members
21st-century Bangladeshi women politicians